Goldtown Ghost Riders is a 1953 American Western film directed by George Archainbaud and starring Gene Autry and Gail Davis.

Plot

Cast
 Gene Autry as Gene Autry  
 Champion as Champ, Gene's Horse  
 Gail Davis as Cathy Wheeler  
 Kirk Riley as Ed Wheeler  
 Carleton Young as Jim Granby  
 Neyle Morrow as Teeno  
 Smiley Burnette as Smiley Burnette
 Steve Conte as Blackwell

References

Bibliography
 Rowan, Terry. The American Western A Complete Film Guide. 2013.

External links
 

1953 films
1953 Western (genre) films
American Western (genre) films
Films directed by George Archainbaud
Columbia Pictures films
American black-and-white films
1950s English-language films
1950s American films